Umarerbari is a village in Pirojpur District in the Barisal Division of southwestern Bangladesh.

References

External links
Satellite map at Maplandia.com

Populated places in Pirojpur District
Villages in Pirojpur District
Villages in Barisal Division